Oxytes is a genus of flowering plants belonging to the family Fabaceae.

Its native range is Papua New Guinea to Northern and Eastern Australia and New Caledonia.

Species
Species:

Oxytes brachypoda 
Oxytes deplanchei 
Oxytes pycnostachya

References

Fabaceae
Fabaceae genera